Giovanni Battista Scanaroli or Giovanni Battista Scannaroli (1579 – 10 September 1664) was a Roman Catholic prelate who served as Titular Bishop of Sidon (1630–1664).

Biography
Giovanni Battista Scanaroli was born in Modène, Italy in 1579.
On 17 December 1622, he was ordained to the priesthood by Ferdinand Boschetti, Titular Archbishop of Diocaesarea in Palaestina. 
On 15 July 1630, he was appointed during the papacy of Pope Urban VIII as Titular Bishop of Sidon. On 7 October 1630, he was consecrated bishop by Luigi Caetani, Cardinal-Priest of Santa Pudenziana, with Antonio Ricciulli, Bishop Emeritus of Belcastro, and Benedetto Landi, Bishop of Fossombrone, serving as co-consecrators. 
He served as Titular Bishop of Sidon until his death on 10 September 1664.

Works

Episcopal succession

References

External links and additional sources
 (for Chronology of Bishops)
 (for Chronology of Bishops)

17th-century Roman Catholic titular bishops
1579 births
1664 deaths
Bishops appointed by Pope Urban VIII